The Boise meridian is one of the 35 principal meridians of the Public Land Survey System of the United States. Adopted in 1867, its longitude is 116° 23′ 35″ (or 116° 24′ 15″) west from Greenwich and its principal baseline is latitude 43° 22′ 21″ north. The Boise meridian governs land surveys in the state of Idaho.

The city of Meridian, Idaho lies directly on the meridian and is a namesake of the meridian.

See also

List of principal and guide meridians and base lines of the United States

References

External links

Meridians and base lines of the United States
Named meridians
Geography of Idaho